As of December 2020, nine women have served or are serving as the governor of an Argentine province. Only seven (out of 23) of the country's provinces have been governed by women.

List of female governors
 Incumbent

List of female vice governors
In all of the provinces, the governor is seconded by a vice governor (vicegobernador or vicegobernadora), while in the City of Buenos Aires, the Chief of Government is seconded by a Deputy Chief who fulfills the same role. The vice governor is first in line should the governor be incapacitated, removed from office or die, and they typically preside over the provincial legislature (or the upper chamber thereof, in case of bicameral legislatures).

Five provinces (Corrientes, Formosa, Salta, San Juan and Tucumán) are yet to count with an elected female governor or vice governor.

 Incumbent

See also
Women in Argentina
List of current provincial governors in Argentina
List of provincial legislatures in Argentina

References

List
Women
Provincial governors in Argentina
Argentine provincial governors
Argentine provincial governors
Argentina